Damian Daniel Isac (born 31 January 2001) is a Romanian professional footballer who plays as a midfielder for Liga I club UTA Arad.

Honours
UTA Arad
Liga II: 2019–20

References

External links
 

2001 births
Living people
People from Caransebeș
Romanian footballers
Romania youth international footballers
Romania under-21 international footballers
Association football midfielders
Liga I players
Liga II players
FC UTA Arad players